Onebala blandiella is a moth in the family Gelechiidae. It was described by Francis Walker in 1864. It is found in Sri Lanka, India and Myanmar.

Adults are fawn coloured with a slight cinereous (ash-grey) tinge, the forewings with slight metallic-green reflections and a large oblong dark brown cinereous-bordered spot in the disc before the middle, as well as a very large exterior triangular dark brown cinereous-bordered spot, which has its base on the costa and extends to the interior border. The hindwings are slightly gilded.

The larvae roll the leaves of Lamium species.

References

Moths described in 1864
Onebala